Leith Run is a stream in the U.S. state of Ohio. It is a tributary to the Ohio River.

Variant names are "Leath's Run", "Leaths Run", "Leiths Run", and "Lieth Run". The stream was named for the Leath family of pioneer settlers, who lived near the stream's mouth.

References

Rivers of Ohio
Rivers of Washington County, Ohio